The 1962 United States Senate election in Ohio took place on November 6, 1962. Incumbent Senator Frank Lausche was re-elected to a second term in office, easily defeating Republican attorney John Marshall Briley.

Democratic primary

Candidates 
Albert T. Ball, candidate for Lt. Governor in 1958
Raymond Warren Beringer, 
Frank Lausche, incumbent Senator since 1957

Republican primary

Candidates 
John S. Ballard, Summit County Prosecutor
John Marshall Briley, general counsel for Owens-Corning Fiberglas
Charles E. Fry, State Senator from Springfield
Ross Pepple, State Senator from Lima

General election

See also 
 1962 United States Senate elections

References

1962
Ohio
United States Senate